Scalesia microcephala is a species of flowering plant in the family Asteraceae. It is endemic to the Galápagos Islands.

References

microcephala
Flora of the Galápagos Islands
Endangered plants
Taxonomy articles created by Polbot